Francesco Buonamici may refer to:

 Francesco Buonamici (1533–1603), Italian doctor, philosopher and writer
 Francesco Buonamici (1596–1677), Italian Baroque architect, painter and engraver
  (1836–1921), Italian lawyer and politician
 Giovan Francesco Buonamici (1692–1759), Italian Baroque architect and painter
  (1592–1669), Italian diplomat